Roxa or Canhabaque is an island in the Bissagos Islands, Guinea-Bissau. It is part of the sector of Bubaque. The island has a population of 2,478 (2009 census), divided over the villages Ambuduco, Ampucute, Ancanhozinho, Indenazinho, Ancaguine, Ancatipe, Angaura, Indena Grande, Ga-Cote, Inore, Ambena, Bine, Inhoda, Idjoue, Eboco, Meneque, Ancanam, Anghudjiga, Anghumba and Antchurupe.

References

Bolama Region
Bissagos Islands